Zhao Yangsheng (born December 1955) is a Chinese scientist currently serving as a professor and doctoral supervisor at Taiyuan University of Technology. He is a member of the International Society for Rock Mechanics (ISRM) and Chinese Society for Rock Mechanics and Engineering (CSRME).

Education
Zhao was born in Taiyuan, Shanxi in December 1955. After the resumption of college entrance examination, he attended Shanxi Mining Institute (now Taiyuan University of Technology) where he received his bachelor's degree in 1982. After completing his master's degree at Fuxin Mining Institute (now Liaoning Technical University), he attended Tongji University where he obtained his doctor's degree in 1992.

Career
In 2018 he founded the National Research and Development Center for Oil Shale Exploitation with Sinopec.

Honours and awards
 1996 National Science Fund for Distinguished Young Scholars
 1999 "Chang Jiang Scholar" (or " Yangtze River Scholar") 
 2005 State Technological Invention Award (Second Class)
 2006 National Labor Medal
 November 22, 2019 Member of the Chinese Academy of Sciences (CAS)

References

1955 births
Living people
People from Taiyuan
Scientists from Shanxi
Taiyuan University of Technology alumni
Liaoning Technical University alumni
Tongji University alumni
Academic staff of Taiyuan University of Technology
Members of the Chinese Academy of Sciences